Bakhyt Shkurullaevich Kenjeev (Kenzheyev, ; 2 August 1950, in Shymkent, Kazakhstan) is a Russian poet of Kazakh descent.

Life
In 1953 his parents moved to Moscow. He graduated from Lomonosov Moscow State University with an equivalent of an M.S. degree in chemistry.  In 1975 he was a founding member of the "Moscow Time" group of poets, with Alexei Tsvetkov, Alexander Soprovsky, and Sergey Gandlevsky.

He is a regular guest at numerous poetry festivals, including Moskow Bienale, Kievskie Lavry, Leningradskie Mosty, Blue Metropolis Montreal festival, and the international poetry festival in Rotterdam, the Netherlands.
He lives in [New York City], and Moscow.

Awards
2003  Moscow-Transit Poetry Prize

Works

English Translations
"Rain Pours Down in Rome, Repeating", West Branch, J. Kayes, Bucknell University

Poetry
 Избранная лирика 1970—1981 (1984 г.)
 Осень в Америке (1988 г.)
 Стихотворения (1995 г.)
 Сочинитель звезд: Книга новых стихотворений, М. 1997
 Снящаяся под утро: Книга стихотворений, М. 2000
 Из семи книг: Стихотворения, Независимая газета, М. 2000
 Невидимые: Стихи, М. 2004
 Вдали мерцает город Галич: Стихи мальчика Теодора, 2006
 Крепостной остывающих мест (2008)

Novels
 Плато (1992 г.)
 Иван Безуглов. Мещанский роман (1993 г.)
 Золото гоблинов: Романы («Младший брат», «Золото гоблинов»), Независимая газета, М 2000,

References

Russian male poets
1950 births
Living people
Moscow State University alumni
Soviet male poets
Soviet poets
20th-century Russian male writers
20th-century Russian poets
21st-century Russian poets
21st-century male writers